Puklice is a municipality and village in Jihlava District in the Vysočina Region of the Czech Republic. It has about 900 inhabitants.

Administrative parts
Villages of Petrovice and Studénky are administrative parts of Puklice.

History
The first written mention of Puklice is from 1318.

References

Villages in Jihlava District